Sir Harry Fang Sin-yang, GBM, CBE, JP (2 August 1923 – 24 August 2009) was a Hong Kong orthopaedic surgeon, legislator and campaigner who promoted rehabilitation services. He was widely known as the "father of rehabilitation" in Asia. A well-known humanitarian, Harry Fang championed the rights of the disabled and disadvantaged. He co-founded the Hong Kong Society for Rehabilitation, and headed the Rehabilitation International for a period of time. In 2009, he died from complications of a stroke.

Biography
Fang was born in Nanking in August 1923. Fang's family moved to Shanghai in 1931 and then moved to Hong Kong in 1938. He received his secondary education at the King's College, Hong Kong, and his degree of medicine from the University of Hong Kong. He then specialized in orthopedics and quickly became an orthopedic surgeon.

Throughout the latter half of the twentieth century, Fang became known as a powerful legislator in Hong Kong. He was a  Member of the Legislative Council of Hong Kong from 1974 to 1985. From 1979 to 1983, he was a member of the Executive Council of Hong Kong. In both of these offices, he campaigned for the rights of the disabled and for rehabilitation.

In 2009, Fang died of complications from a stroke.

References

1923 births
2009 deaths
Alumni of King's College, Hong Kong
Alumni of the University of Hong Kong
Alumni of the University of Liverpool
Chinese orthopedic surgeons
Commanders of the Order of the British Empire
Hong Kong activists
Hong Kong surgeons
Knights Bachelor
Members of the Executive Council of Hong Kong
Members of the Legislative Council of Hong Kong
Members of the Selection Committee of Hong Kong
Politicians from Nanjing
Recipients of the Grand Bauhinia Medal
Recipients of the Paralympic Order
Physicians from Jiangsu
20th-century surgeons
Chinese emigrants to British Hong Kong